The 1999 Direct Line International Championships doubles was the doubles event of the twenty-fifth edition of the Eastbourne International, a WTA Tier II tennis tournament held in Eastbourne, England and part of the European grass court season. Mariaan de Swardt and Jana Novotná were the defending doubles champions but each competed with different partners in 1999. De Swardt partnered Elena Tatarkova and reached the semifinals where they lost to Martina Hingis and Anna Kournikova. Novotná teamed with Natasha Zvereva and they retired in the final to Hingis and Kournikova after losing the first set 4–6.

Seeds

  Jana Novotná /  Natasha Zvereva (final)
  Martina Hingis /  Anna Kournikova (champions)
  Alexandra Fusai /  Nathalie Tauziat (first round)
  Elena Likhovtseva /  Ai Sugiyama (quarterfinals)

Draw

Qualifying

Seeds

  Catherine Barclay /  Kerry-Anne Guse (first round)
  Miho Saeki /  Anne-Gaëlle Sidot (first round)

Qualifiers
  Maja Murić /  Christína Papadáki

Qualifying draw

External links
1999 Direct Line International Championships Doubles Draw

Direct Line International Championships
Doubles